San Pedro is a district of the Poás canton, in the Alajuela province of Costa Rica.

Geography 
San Pedro has an area of  km² and an elevation of  metres. It is in the mountains of the Cordillera Central (Central Mountain Range) in Costa Rica. It is 13 kilometers northwest of the provincial capital city of Alajuela and 32 kilometers from the national capital city of San Jose.

Demographics 

For the 2011 census, San Pedro had a population of  inhabitants.

Transportation

Road transportation 
The district is covered by the following road routes:
 National Route 107
 National Route 130
 National Route 146
 National Route 723

References 

Districts of Alajuela Province
Populated places in Alajuela Province